Ithel or Idwal ap Morgan was a king of Gwent and Glywysing (i.e., Morgannwg) in southeastern Wales.

His father was Morgan the Generous, the probable namesake of the later realm of Morgannwg (whence modern Glamorgan). Ithel seems to have inherited his father's realm intact, but then divided it among his many sons: Ffernfael in Gwent and Rhys, Rhodri, and Meurig in parts of Glywysing.

References

Welsh royalty